Cape is the surname of:

 Jack Cape (1911–1994), English footballer
 Joey Cape (born 1966), American singer, songwriter and producer
 Safford Cape (1906–1973), American conductor and musicologist
 Thomas Cape (1868–1947), English Member of Parliament

See also
 Geoff Capes (born 1949), British retired strongman and shot putter
 Jack Capes (1898–1933), English hockey players and cricketer